Nebria louisae is a species of ground beetle in the Carabinae subfamily that is endemic to Canada.

References

louisae
Beetles described in 1984
Beetles of North America
Endemic fauna of Canada